Bible translations into constructed languages that were created as part of a fictional setting include:

Quenya
Quenya is a fictional language devised by J. R. R. Tolkien. Various parts of the Bible have been translated into Neo-Quenya, an attempt at editing a unified Quenya from Tolkien's evolving and often contradictory ideas about the language. Helge Fauskanger has translated the New Testament and is currently translating the Old Testament. Psalm 130 has also been translated by people on the website Aglardh.

LOLcat

The LOLCat Bible Translation Project is a wiki-based website where editors aim to parody the entire Bible in "LOLspeak", the slang popularized by the LOLcat Internet phenomenon. LOLspeak has been called "kitty pidgin" and also been likened to baby talk. The project relies on contributors to adapt passages. As of March 27, 2008, approximately 61% of the text had been adapted.

Klingon
 Klingon Bible Translation Project on KLI.org
 Religious Text Translation Project on the Klingon Language wiki

Co-ordinated by Melanie Roney, the KBTP has assumed the immense task of translating the books of the Bible, both the Old and New Testaments, into Klingon. Promoted by the Klingon Language Institute (whose goals do not include missionary work, but this project was considered worthy of KLI's efforts for purely secular reasons).

NSKOL has published two volumes containing several portions of the Bible translated. One can find online the following specimen:

The linguist Nick Nicholas has also translated the Gospel of Mark into Klingon Link

Na'vi
Naʼvi is the constructed language of the Naʼvi, the sapient humanoid indigenous inhabitants of the fictional moon Pandora in the 2009 film Avatar. It was created by Paul Frommer, a professor at the USC Marshall School of Business with a doctorate in linguistics.

Work on the Naʼvi language has continued even after the film's release.  In 2009, I ts creator, Paul Frommer, was working on a compendium which he planned to deliver to Fox in the near future.  He think that the language "[has] a life of its own," and thinks it's "wonderful" that the language has developed a following, as is evident through the increasing learner community of the language.
 Na'vi Bible Translation Project

Láadan
Láadan is a constructed women's language from Suzette Haden Elgin's Native Tongue trilogy. In a fictional future in which the United States Constitution's Nineteenth Amendment has been repealed, and women no longer have the rights of adults, a group of women has constructed a language to express women's thoughts and experiences more adeptly than can the languages of male-dominated society. In the second book of the series, The Judas Rose, the constructors of Láadan use Thursday-night women's prayer services beyond their own households. Part of this task involves translating the King James Version into Láadan. A portion of Psalm 23, verse 5 is translated with cultural shifts:

The King James Version reads, here, "…thou anointest my head with oil…"

See also 
 Bible translations into Esperanto

References

External links
Neo-Quenya New Testament Project

fictional languages
Fictional languages